The SDF insurgency in Northern Aleppo refers to a campaign of armed attacks carried out by the Syrian Democratic Forces (SDF), following the expansion of the Turkish occupation of northern Syria after the early 2018 Operation Olive Branch carried out by the Turkish Armed Forces (TAF) and the Turkish-backed Free Syrian Army (TFSA).

Background
Shortly after the defeat of the People's Protection Units (YPG) in the Afrin Region, the spokeswoman for the Kurdish Democratic Union Party (Syria) (PYD), had already announced that the SDF would fight Turkish and allied opposition forces using guerrilla tactics. The YPG also stated "We reiterate that these terrorists and their families are the main targets of our forces. Our forces will target all the elements in the Afrin Canton that are in contact or cooperation with the Turkish invasion state." The "Wrath of Olives" operations room was established in early summer 2018, although the YPG has denied affiliation with the group.

By May 2018, an insurgency had broken out in the Afrin District, as the YPG along with allied militants, as well as an armed insurgent group called the "Afrin Falcons", began carrying out bombings, ambushes and assassinations against the Turkish Army, SNA forces, and civilians sympathetic or affiliated with them.  Other areas with pro-SDF guerrilla activity include Azaz and al-Bab, which have been under Turkish occupation since 2016.

Timeline

2018
By mid-2018, the insurgency was mostly focused on the rural areas and Afrin city's outskirts, where the Turkish Air Force targeted guerilla holdouts between May and July. In May, the YPG killed the former leader of the Free East Ghouta Police, Jamal al-Zaghloul, who had been tasked with police duties in Afrin, with a mine in al-Basouta, south of Afrin city. Following his death, the YPG stated that "anyone in cooperation with the invasion forces is our target".

May
 3 May - YPG forces carried out an attack against Turkish army units positioned at Mahmoodiyyah district in Afrin city center. At least one soldier was killed and two others injured according to the YPG.
 4 May - The People's Protection Units (YPG) released a statement vowing to target anyone who is in cooperation with the "invasion forces" and claimed responsibility for the assassination of Jamal al-Zaghloul, head of the "Free East Ghouta Police".
 5 May - The People's Protection Units (YPG) killed seven Ahrar Sharqiyyah jihadists and one Turkish soldier in two attacks in Afrin and Jinderes.
 8 May - The People's Protection Units (YPG) claimed responsibility for the attack against the military base of the Turkish-backed "23rd Brigade" on the road between Jinderes district and village of Hammam in Afrin region. According to the YPG, five "terrorists" were neutralized as a result.
 12 May - Heavy clashes occurred between Turkish-backed Free Syrian Army (TFSA) and People's Protection Units (YPG) in the vicinity of villages of Maidankah, Qurtqoolaq and Kafarromah in Afrin’s Sherawa district. According to the YPG, at least seven "terrorists" were killed.

August
 9 August - The National Front for Liberation (NFL) clashed with the YPG in Kafr Nabu and Ba'ai in the southern part of the Afrin district near the border with the Idlib Governorate. Four YPG fighters were killed and several light weapons and explosives were captured by the NFL. An NFL representative told journalists that the group had been monitoring the YPG cell for months as the area had seen heightened levels of violence, mainly assassinations targeting fighters and civilians with links to the Syrian National Army (SNA) by YPG cells active in the region.
 26 August - The YPG released a video showing the assassination of an al-Rahman Legion commander, Abu Muhammad Al-Shmali, in Babili.

December
 3 December - Jaysh al-Islam claimed to have foiled an attempted YPG infiltration in northwestern Aleppo, in the town of Deir Mushmush.
 8 December - A Sultan Murad Division commander named Abu al-Mot was assassinated in Afrin's Sherawa district by unknown gunmen. YPG claimed responsibility for the attack in a statement released on December 11.
 15 December - The YPG Press Office released a statement and claimed to have killed four Sham Legion and two Sultan Murad Division "mercenaries" on December 14.
 21 December - The Afrin Liberation Forces (HRE), a pro-YPG insurgent group, was established and released a press statement laying out the group's goals; the group stated that they seek to end the "occupation of their areas" and that they would carry out operations as part of a "justified war" until the region is "liberated". The statement also claimed responsibility for two attacks: one on 18 December involving the detonation of an improvised explosive device (IED) against Turkish soldiers, claiming as many as six men had been injured and killed, and another attack on the same date, the detonation of another IED on forces of the Hamza Division.

2019

January
 20 January - an explosion killed and injured dozens in Afrin city. A medical source claimed that the attack resulted in three dead and 12 injured. On the same day, the HRE claimed to have attacked construction equipment belonging to Turkish forces used for building trenches and tunnels, stating that jihadist fighters allied with the Turkish military had been killed during the attack.
 23 January - two bombings occurred outside the headquarters of Ahrar al-Sharqiya in the town of Rajo in the Afrin district. No group claimed responsibility for the attack. Three members of the group were killed by the bombs.

February
 21 February - A car bombing occurred near a hospital in Afrin city during a Syrian National Army parade, pro-YPG media outlets stated that casualties occurred as a result of the bombing.
 24 February - A member of the Sultan Murad Division was killed by an IED while attempting to dismantle it.

April
 8 April - The Turkish military began training allied rebel forces on air landing via helicopters in Afrin in anticipation of possible planned operations against SDF.
 12 April - Turkish forces shelled YPG positions near Tell Rifaat. The YPG responded by shelling positions under Turkish and allied rebel control. Russian military police had withdrawn from the location two days before.

May
 4 May - Heavy clashes erupted between Turkish Armed Forces and allied Syrian National Army rebels with the Afrin Liberation Forces (HRE) over the death of two Turkish soldiers. During the fighting, the Turkish-backed Syrian National Army captured three villages in the northern part of the Tell Rifaat Subdistrict from the HRE, but were later forced to withdraw due to a counter-attack and large number of landmines. The HRE claimed to have killed 40 Syrian National Army fighters, including their field commander "Ahmad Jamil Harboushi" and released several images displaying enemy losses. The operation was later cancelled, which resulted in a Turkish and rebel defeat. 
 7 May - The HRE released a video and claimed to have injured 3 Turkish-backed Syrian National Army militants in Azaz with an ATGM.
 9 May - The HRE released two videos showing the death of four Turkish-backed Syrian National Army militants and the destruction of a bulldozer using an ATGM in the Sherawa district of Afrin region.
 13 May - Two Syrian National Army fighters were found dead with gunshot wounds near Sijaraz village in the countryside of Azaz. No group has claimed responsibility for the attack.
 31 May - The HRE released a video of a drone attack targeting the base of Turkish-backed Syrian National Army in the village of Jalbir, Afrin region. Two Turkish soldiers were killed as a result.

August
 5 August - HRE stated that it attacked and killed 8 fighters belonging to Ahrar al-Sham and Suqour al-Sham at a base near Mare' and injuring another 4, using AK47 rifles and PK light machine guns as well as RPG-7s. On the same day, HRE also stated that it attacked a Hamza Division base near al-Bab, saying that 3 Hamza Division members were killed and 3 were injured.
 6 August - HRE published a video and stated that it targeted a military vehicle belonging to Turkish-backed Levant Front rebels near Mare town. The vehicle was destroyed with an ATGM.
 9 August - HRE stated that it has killed 7 Turkish soldiers during an attack on a Turkish military checkpoint.

October
 11 October - Two Turkish soldiers were killed by a mortar attack in Azaz, originating from Tel Rifaat during Operation Peace Spring.

November
 16 November - As part of the November 2019 Syria bombings, a few car bombs detonated near a bus station and a taxi station in Al-Bab, killing at least 19 and injuring around 50 others. Turkey condemned the attack and said the PKK was behind the bombing.

2020

March
 20 March - Clashes at Basuta occur west of Tell Rifaat between the Afrin Liberation Forces and the TFSA. Injuries from Firqat al Hamza were taken to the Military Hospital in Afrin according to a local source.

April
 28 April - The Afrin bombing killed 53 people, including 11 children. Turkey blamed the YPG, who blamed the rebel infighting. According to the head of the British-based Observatory for human rights in Syria, at least six pro-Turkish Syrian fighters were among those killed in the blast with a possibility of increase in the death toll. At least 47 people were reported injured, according to Al Jazeera. According to the governor of the neighbouring Hatay province, across the Turkish border, the explosion was believed to have been caused by the rigging of a fuel tanker with hand grenades. Many people, alongside those who got trapped in their cars were burnt to death as a result of the blast, Syrian activists disclosed.

May
 6 May - The Afrin Liberation Forces (HRE) released a video of two separate attacks in Afrin region. According to the HRE, two Turkish soldiers and two Turkish-backed fighters were killed as a result of the attacks.
 12 May - The Afrin Liberation Forces (HRE) announced that at least six "invaders" were killed during actions carried out between 5–11 May in Afrin region and Mare' town.
 19 May - An IED exploded near the Al-Qebban roundabout on the road to Jinderes which injured two people.
 21 May - A former ISIL commander named Abu Zaki al-Taybani, who was the head of ISIL's military operations in the Hama Governorate was killed by a CJTF-OIR drone strike in Afrin. He had defected to the Syrian National Army and had previously executed several members of ISIL's former off shoot and rival Hayat Tahrir al-Sham prior to defecting to the SNA, and reportedly had over 200 thousand dollars in his vehicle.
 28 May - The Afrin Liberation Forces (HRE) announced that at least nine "occupiers" were killed, including a commander, as a result of several operations carried out between 17–25 May.

June
 13 June - The Turkish Ministry of National Defense and state-owned media claimed that 6 "PKK/YPG terrorists" were arrested in the "Olive Branch" region.
 21 June - The Afrin Liberation Forces released a graphic footage and claimed that 14 Turkish-backed militants were killed. The attack was in retaliation for the death of three HRE fighters.

August
 12 August - The Turkish Ministry of National Defense announced that twenty "PKK/YPG terrorists" were arrested while planning an attack in the Olive Branch region.
 14 August - The Turkish Ministry of National Defense announced that four "PKK/YPG terrorists" were arrested while planning an attack in the Olive Branch region.
 22 August - According to pro-Kurdish sources, the Turkish army and allied rebels shelled the town of Tell Rifaat and the village of Sheikh Issa.

September
 14 September - The HRE released a video of their attacks against two Turkish bases located in the village of Xizewiye in the Jindires district of Afrin region. According to the HRE, seven Turkish soldiers were killed and ten others wounded as a result of the operations. A car bomb was detonated near the bus station in Afrin city center shortly after. The Turkish Ministry of National Defense blamed the attack on the YPG-led Syrian Democratic Forces (SDF) and stated that 5 civilians were killed and 22 others wounded as a result of the bombing. The Turkish Armed Forces shelled several villages with artillery in Tell Rifaat Subdistrict in retaliation, according to local and Kurdish sources.
 15 September - Turkish-backed Free Syrian Army (TFSA) fighters attempted to infiltrate HRE positions in Maranaz village, but were repelled and lost two fighters. Heavy clashes ensued between TFSA and HRE around the village with Turkish artillery shelling HRE positions. 
 21 September - Clashes occurred between the Afrin Liberation Forces (HRE) and Turkish-backed fighters near Kafr Khasir and Maranaz villages.

2021

January
 30 January - A car bombing killed at least five people and wounded 22 others in the Turkish-controlled town of Afrin in northern Syria. The Turkish Ministry of National Defense accused the Kurdish-led YPG of being behind the attack.

April 
 7 April - An ATGM attack by the HRE kills 2 Turkish soldiers.

June 
 3 June - An ATGM attack by the HRE kills 1 Turkish soldier.

July 
 24 July - An ATGM attack by the HRE kills 2 Turkish soldiers.

September 
 7 September - A rocket attack by the HRE kills 1 Turkish soldier.

October 
 7 October - An ATGM attack by the HRE kills 1 Turkish soldier.
 10 October - An ATGM attack by the HRE kills 2 Turkish special police forces.

2022

April 
 22 April - An ATGM attack by the HRE kills 1 Turkish police officer.

May 
 4 May - A rocket attack by the HRE kills 1 Turkish soldier.

July
 26 July - An artillery attack claimed by the HRE kills 2 Turkish soldiers.

August 
 23 August - A rocket attack by the HRE wounds 1 Turkish soldier, who later dies on 9 September.

October 
 2 October - A rocket attack by the HRE kills 1 Turkish special police officer.

November 
 22 November - A rocket attack by the HRE kills 3 civilians in Azaz and injures another 5.

2023

January 
 13 January - A rocket attack by the HRE kills 1 Turkish soldier.

See also
Eastern Syria insurgency
Insurgency in Idlib
Second Northern Syria Buffer Zone

References

Aleppo Governorate in the Syrian civil war